Ingrid Elise Dahle is a UK-based Norwegian comedian and actress.

Early life
Dahle was born in Stavanger Norway, and grew up in Hommersåk.

Comedy career

In 2012 she won the Brighton Comedy Festival inaugural 'Squawker Award', and thus performed at the Brighton Dome for the Best of the Fest. Dahle was nominated for the final of So You Think You're Funny? (SYTYF) in 2012. In 2015 she was runner up in Leicester Mercury Comedian of the Year.

Dahle is a supporter of many charities and performs at comedy fundraising events. She performed at Charity Chuckle, Komedia Brighton in 2012 and again in 2015 helping to raise funds for Stand Up To End Violence Against Women, and also the Young People's Centre Brighton.  In 2019 Ingrid performed at Union Chapel London to fundraise for 'Bloody Good Period' which works towards ending period poverty for those who cannot afford essential products

In 2018, Dahle supported Jen Brister on her sixth UK tour 'Meaningless'. She was a supporting act on Desiree Burch October–November 2019 UK tour.

Comedy festivals
 Brighton Fringe 2012, 2018, 2019
 Edinburgh Fringe 2013, 2016, 2018
 Green Man Festival 2017
 Wychwood Festival 2017
 Machynlleth Comedy Festival – 2017, 2018, 2019, 2020
 Fringe Theatrefest Barnstaple 2018, 2019, 2020

Film and radio
Dahle played Esther, the lead character in Being Nice, a short comedy drama released 2015 directed by Leah Revivo. A socially inept factory girl (Esther) decides to try and fit in, but 'Being Nice' is never as simple as it sounds. Being Nice was accepted into 9 film festivals including: Royal Television Society – Student Awards, Screentest National Student Film Festival and LA Cinefest. The Monthly Film Festival guide reviewed it; 2.5 stars out of 3.

In 2017 her 'Mach-Fest diary' was presented for BBC Radio 4's Comedy Club at Machynlleth Comedy Festival.

Awards and nominations

Personal life
She resides in Brighton & Hove.

References

External links
 Official website
 

Year of birth missing (living people)
Living people
Actors from Stavanger
People from Brighton and Hove
Norwegian women comedians
Norwegian women writers
20th-century Norwegian actresses
21st-century Norwegian actresses